Lachnoanaerobaculum umeaense  is a Gram-positive, obligately anaerobic, saccharolytic, non-proteolytic and spore-forming bacterium from the genus of Lachnoanaerobaculum which has been isolated from the human intestine of a patient in Umeå in Sweden.

References

External links
Type strain of Lachnoanaerobaculum umeaense at BacDive -  the Bacterial Diversity Metadatabase

Lachnospiraceae
Bacteria described in 2012